He Wanted His Pants is a 1914 American silent comedy film featuring Oliver Hardy.

Plot

Cast
 Raymond McKee as James Jimson
 Oliver Hardy as A Cop (as Babe Hardy)

See also
 List of American films of 1914
 Oliver Hardy filmography

External links

1914 films
1914 short films
American silent short films
Silent American comedy films
American black-and-white films
1914 comedy films
Films directed by Arthur Hotaling
American comedy short films
1910s American films
1910s English-language films